Rui Ebata (江幡塁, Ebata Rui) is a Japanese kickboxer, fighting out of Tokyo, Japan.

As of August 2021, he is the #6 ranked flyweight in the world according to Combat Press.

Martial arts career

Winning the SNKA and WKBA titles
Ebata made his professional debut in 2007, with a unanimous decision win against Hiraeita Kano. After winning his debut fight, Ebata won 12 of his next 15 fights, only losing once, to Shota Takiya. He was given a chance to fight Daihachi Furuoka for the SNKA Bantamweight title during SNKA MAGNUM 26. He won it by a second-round TKO. He was scheduled to defend his title during SNKA BRAVE HEARTS 19, against Shirō. Ebata successfully defended the title, as the match ended in a draw.

Rui Ebata won his next four fights as well, before challenging Surachai Srisuriyanyothin for the Rajadamnern Stadium Super Bantamweight title, during SNKA TITANS NEOS XIV. Surachai won the fight by a fourth-round KO, snapping Ebata's 21 fight unbeaten streak.

In his next fight, Ebata fought Boonlai Sitnaigachon for the WKBA Super Bantamweight title. He won it through a second-round KO. He defended it for the first and only time during SNKA TITANS NEOS 17, when he was scheduled to fight Phetnamnen Sor.Panyokit. Rui won the fight in the fourth round, after knocking Phetnamnen with an uppercut.

KNOCK OUT Super Bantamweight tournament
After successfully defending his title, Ebata went on a 12–1 run, only losing to Senpichit STD Transport, and achieving a notable victory over Eisaku Ogasawara.

Ebata participated in the KNOCK OUT Super Bantamweight tournament, for the inaugural Super Bantamweight title. In the semifinal bout, he won a majority decision against Takashi Ohno, and in the finals he won a unanimous decision in a rematch with Eisaku Ogasawara.

Rizin and RISE debut
Ebata fought Tenshin Nasukawa in his Rizin debut, during Rizin 20 - Saitama. He lost the fight midway through the first round, by TKO. He was more successful in his next Rizin appearance, managing to win a unanimous decision against Seiki Ueyama.

Ebata participated in the 2020 RISE DEAD OR ALIVE tournament, and is scheduled to fight Masahiko Suzuki in the semifinals. He lost the semifinal bout by decision.

At RISE Eldorado 2021, Ebata fought KENGO, whom he beat by a first-round knockout.

Titles and accomplishments

Shin Nihon Kickboxing Association
 2011 SNKA Bantamweight Champion 
World Kick Boxing Association
 2014 WKBA World Super Bantamweight Champion 
KNOCK OUT
 2019 KNOCK OUT Super Bantamweight Champion

Awards
 2020 Combat Press Fight of the Year (vs Masahiko Suzuki)

Fight record

|-  style="text-align:center; background:#fbb"
| 2022-04-02 || Loss ||align=left| Shiro || RISE El Dorado 2022 || Tokyo, Japan || KO (Right high kick) ||2  ||1:39
|-  style="text-align:center; background:#fbb"
| 2021-11-14 || Loss || align=left| Masahiko Suzuki || RISE World Series 2021 Osaka 2 || Osaka, Japan ||KO (Right Cross)|| 1 || 1:49

|-  style="text-align:center; background:#cfc;"
| 2021-02-28 || Win ||align=left| Kengo || RISE Eldorado 2021|| Yokohama, Japan || KO (Left Hook) || 1 || 2:38

|-  style="text-align:center; background:#fbb;"
| 2020-11-01|| Loss||align=left| Masahiko Suzuki || RISE DEAD OR ALIVE 2020 Osaka, Semi Final||  Osaka, Japan || Decision (Unanimous) ||3 ||3:00

|-  style="text-align:center; background:#cfc;"
| 2020-08-09 || Win ||align=left| Seiki Ueyama || Rizin 22 – Yokohama || Yokohama, Japan || Decision (Unanimous) || 3 || 3:00

|-  style="text-align:center; background:#FFBBBB;"
| 2019-12-31|| Loss ||align=left| Tenshin Nasukawa || Rizin 20 - Saitama || Saitama, Japan || TKO (3 knockdown rule) || 1 || 2:44

|-  style="text-align:center; background:#CCFFCC;"
| 2019-08-18|| Win||align=left| Eisaku Ogasawara || K.O CLIMAX 2019 SUMMER KICK FEVER, Final || Tokyo, Japan || Decision (Unanimous)|| 3 || 3:00
|-
! style=background:white colspan=9 |

|-  style="text-align:center; background:#CCFFCC;"
| 2019-08-18|| Win||align=left| Takashi Ohno || K.O CLIMAX 2019 SUMMER KICK FEVER, Semi Final || Tokyo, Japan || Decision (Majority) || 3 || 3:00

|-  style="text-align:center; background:#CCFFCC;"
| 2019-03-03|| Win||align=left| Anajak Sit Kaewprayun || SNKA MAGNUM 49 || Tokyo, Japan || Decision (Unanimous)|| 5 || 3:00

|-  style="text-align:center; background:#CCFFCC;"
| 2018-12-09|| Win||align=left| Samuay Phetmuantarat || SNKA SOUL IN THE RING 16 || Tokyo, Japan || TKO (High Kick)|| 3 ||

|-  style="text-align:center; background:#CCFFCC;"
| 2018-10-21|| Win||align=left| Tepburi Or Detpon || SNKA MAGNUM 48 || Tokyo, Japan || TKO (Ref. Stoppage/Knees) || 2 ||

|-  style="text-align:center; background:#CCFFCC;"
| 2018-06-08|| Win ||align=left| Eisaku Ogasawara || KNOCK OUT SURVIVAL DAYS || Tokyo, Japan || KO (Straight Right) || 3 || 1:34

|-  style="text-align:center; background:#CCFFCC;"
| 2018-04-15|| Win ||align=left| Yun Dok Jae || SNKA TITANS NEOS 23 || Tokyo, Japan || Decision (Unanimous) || 5 || 3:00

|-  style="text-align:center; background:#CCFFCC;"
| 2017-12-10 || Win||align=left| Keisuke Miyamoto || KNOCK OUT 2017 in Ryogoku || Tokyo, Japan || Decision (Majority) || 5 || 3:00

|-  style="text-align:center; background:#CCFFCC;"
| 2017-07-02 || Win||align=left| Yodyangam Tetrat || SNKA MAGNUM 44 || Tokyo, Japan || TKO (Low Kicks)|| 2 || 0:56

|-  style="text-align:center; background:#CCFFCC;"
| 2016-10-23 || Win||align=left| Senpichit STD Transport  || SNKA MAGNUM 42 || Tokyo, Japan || TKO (Ref. Stoppage/Low Kicks) || 4 || 0:51

|-  style="text-align:center; background:#CCFFCC;"
| 2016-07-13 || Win||align=left| Petkravee PetpumMuaythai || SNKA MAGNUM 41 || Tokyo, Japan || TKO (Corner Stoppage)|| 3 || 1:53

|-  style="text-align:center; background:#FFBBBB;"
| 2016-05-29 || Loss||align=left| Senpichit STD Transport || Rajadamnern Stadium || Bangkok, Thailand || Decision || 5 || 3:00

|-  style="text-align:center; background:#CCFFCC;"
| 2016-03-13 || Win||align=left| Glaipet Portawachai || SNKA MAGNUM 40 || Tokyo, Japan || Decision (Majority)|| 5 || 3:00

|-  style="text-align:center; background:#CCFFCC;"
| 2015-10-25 || Win||align=left| Prapupram Banbor Witayakom || SNKA MAGNUM 39 || Tokyo, Japan || KO (Body Punches) || 2 || 2:33

|-  style="text-align:center; background:#CCFFCC;"
| 2015-07-12 || Win||align=left| Kochasarn Dragonmuaythai || SNKA MAGNUM 38 || Tokyo, Japan || KO (Right Uppercut) || 5 || 2:13

|-  style="text-align:center; background:#CCFFCC;"
| 2015-04-19 || Win||align=left| Phetnamnen Sor.Panyokit || SNKA TITANS NEOS 17 || Tokyo, Japan || KO (Ref. Stoppage/Uppercut)|| 4 || 2:23 
|-
! style=background:white colspan=9 |

|-  style="text-align:center; background:#CCFFCC;"
| 2014-10-26 || Win||align=left| Hontonglek Chor.Forpuriansi || SNKA MAGNUM 36 || Tokyo, Japan || Decision (Unanimous)|| 5 || 3:00

|-  style="text-align:center; background:#CCFFCC;"
| 2014-07-20 || Win||align=left| Nampet Sor.Tamtip || SNKA MAGNUM 35 || Tokyo, Japan || Decision (Unanimous)|| 5 || 3:00

|-  style="text-align:center; background:#CCFFCC;"
| 2014-03-09 || Win||align=left| Boonlai Sitnaigachon || SNKA MAGNUM 34 || Tokyo, Japan || KO (Left Hook to the Body) || 2 ||  
|-
! style=background:white colspan=9 |

|-  style="text-align:center; background:#FFBBBB;"
| 2013-09-16 || Loss ||align=left| Surachai Srisuriyanyothin || SNKA TITANS NEOS XIV || Tokyo, Japan || KO (Knee)|| 4 || 2:12 
|-
! style=background:white colspan=9 |

|-  style="text-align:center; background:#CCFFCC;"
| 2013-07-21 || Win ||align=left| Fonpet Chuwattana || SNKA MAGNUM 32 || Tokyo, Japan || KO (Left Straight)|| 3 || 2:38

|-  style="text-align:center; background:#CCFFCC;"
| 2013-04-21 || Win ||align=left| Denisarn Sor.Suistor  || SNKA TITANS NEOS 13 || Tokyo, Japan || TKO (Elbows) || 1 || 0:45

|-  style="text-align:center; background:#CCFFCC;"
| 2012-12-09 || Win ||align=left| Ronachai Sor.Sonmi  || SNKA SOUL IN THE RING IX || Tokyo, Japan || Decision|| 3 || 3:00

|-  style="text-align:center; background:#CCFFCC;"
| 2012-10-14 || Win ||align=left| Wattana Sitkaewbantit  || SNKA MAGNUM 30 || Tokyo, Japan || KO || 2 || 1:16

|-  style="text-align:center; background:#c5d2ea;"
| 2012-05-13 || Draw ||align=left| Shiro || SNKA BRAVE HEARTS 19 || Tokyo, Japan || Decision || 5  || 3:00 
|-
! style=background:white colspan=9 |

|-  style="text-align:center; background:#CCFFCC;"
| 2012-03-11 || Win||align=left| Petdam Chuwattana || SNKA MAGNUM 28|| Tokyo, Japan || KO (Low kicks & Punches)|| 4|| 0:50

|-  style="text-align:center; background:#CCFFCC;"
| 2012-01-15 || Win||align=left| Kim Jun Se || SNKA BRAVE HEARTS 18|| Tokyo, Japan || Decision (Unanimous)|| 3 || 3:00

|-  style="text-align:center; background:#CCFFCC;"
| 2011-10-02 || Win||align=left| Kwanton Lukpetnoi || SNKA MAGNUM 27|| Tokyo, Japan || Decision (Majority)|| 3 || 3:00

|-  style="text-align:center; background:#CCFFCC;"
| 2011-07-24 || Win||align=left| Daihachi Furuoka || SNKA MAGNUM 26|| Tokyo, Japan || TKO (Doctor Stoppage/Elbow) || 2 || 0:47 
|-
! style=background:white colspan=9 |

|-  style="text-align:center; background:#CCFFCC;"
| 2011-05-15 || Win||align=left| Shiro || SNKA BRAVE HEARTS 16|| Tokyo, Japan || Decision (Unanimous)|| 3 || 3:00

|-  style="text-align:center; background:#CCFFCC;"
| 2011-03-26 || Win||align=left| Egkarat KBA || SNKA MAGNUM 25|| Tokyo, Japan || KO || 2 || 2:31

|-  style="text-align:center; background:#CCFFCC;"
| 2010-12-18 || Win||align=left| Benny Yukihide || SNKA SOUL IN THE RING VIII|| Tokyo, Japan || KO (Left High Kick) || 2 || 1:09

|-  style="text-align:center; background:#CCFFCC;"
| 2010-11-14 || Win||align=left| Thayatlek Sitpanjaphon	 || Rajadamnern Stadium || Bangkok, Thailand || KO  || 1 ||

|-  style="text-align:center; background:#CCFFCC;"
| 2010-09-11 || Win||align=left| Naronchai Dragontailgym || SNKA TITANS NEOS VIII|| Tokyo, Japan || KO (Left Leg kick) || 2 || 1:12

|-  style="text-align:center; background:#c5d2ea;"
| 2010-05-30 || Draw||align=left| Benny Yukihide || SNKA KNOCK OUT 3|| Tokyo, Japan || Decision || 3 || 3:00

|-  style="text-align:center; background:#CCFFCC;"
| 2010-04-18 || Win ||align=left| DAISUKE || SNKA TITANS NEOS VII|| Tokyo, Japan || TKO (Doctor Stoppage)|| 2 || 3:00

|-  style="text-align:center; background:#CCFFCC;"
| 2009-12-13 || Win ||align=left| Yasuhiko Abe || SNKA SOUL IN THE RING VII|| Tokyo, Japan || Decision (Unanimous)|| 3 || 3:00

|-  style="text-align:center; background:#CCFFCC;"
| 2009-09-20 || Win ||align=left| Tomochika || SNKA TITANS NEOS 6|| Tokyo, Japan || Decision (Unanimous)|| 3 || 3:00

|-  style="text-align:center; background:#CCFFCC;"
| 2009-05-03 || Win ||align=left| Yasukichi|| SNKA KNOCK OUT 2|| Tokyo, Japan || Decision (Majority)|| 2 || 3:00

|-  style="text-align:center; background:#CCFFCC;"
| 2009-03-29 || Win ||align=left| Shohei Hayama|| SNKA TITANS NEOS V|| Tokyo, Japan || Decision (Unanimous)|| 2 || 3:00

|-  style="text-align:center; background:#CCFFCC;"
| 2009-01-18 || Win ||align=left| Yasukichi|| SNKA BRAVE HEARTS 10|| Tokyo, Japan || Decision (Majority)|| 2 || 3:00

|-  style="text-align:center; background:#FFBBBB;"
| 2008-08-29 || Loss||align=left| Shota Takiya || K-1 Koshien KING OF UNDER 18～FINAL16～|| Tokyo, Japan || Decision || 3 || 3:00

|-  style="text-align:center; background:#CCFFCC;"
| 2008-07-13 || Win ||align=left| Shogo Iizuka || SNKA MAGNUM 17|| Tokyo, Japan || Decision (Unanimous)|| 2 || 3:00

|-  style="text-align:center; background:#c5d2ea;"
| 2008-01-20 || No Contest ||align=left| Yasukichi|| SNKA BRAVE HEARTS 7|| Tokyo, Japan || || 1 ||

|-  style="text-align:center; background:#CCFFCC;"
| 2007-09-16 ||Win ||align=left| Hiraeita Kano  || SNKA TITANS NEOS 2|| Tokyo, Japan ||Decision (Unanimous)|| 2 || 3:00
|-
| colspan=9 | Legend:

References

Living people
1991 births
Japanese male kickboxers
Flyweight kickboxers
Sportspeople from Ibaraki Prefecture
People from Tsuchiura